"Played-A-Live (The Bongo Song)" is a song by Danish percussion duo Safri Duo. It was released in 2000 as the lead single from their first mainstream studio album, Episode II. The Michael Parsberg-produced song, which has a mix of tribal drums with electronic music twists, sold 1.5 million copies worldwide and became the fourth-fastest-selling single ever in Europe. The single topped the Danish Singles Chart. Outside Denmark, the single also topped the Swiss Singles Chart and peaked at number two in the Netherlands, Germany, and Belgium (Flanders and Wallonia). It reached number six in the United Kingdom and number seven on Billboard's Hot Dance Club Songs chart in the United States.

"Played-A-Live (The Bongo Song)" song was awarded "Danish Club Hit of the Year" at the 2001 Danish Music Awards. The song has also been used as one of the themes for the Kingda Ka coaster at Six Flags Great Adventure.

Track listings

Credits and personnel
 Writers: Morten Friis, Uffe Savery, Michael Parsberg
 Produced and arranged by Safri Duo, Michael Parsberg
 Mixing: Safri Duo, Michael Parsberg, Johnny Stage
 All instruments "played-a-live" by Safri Duo
 Recorded in The Safri Studio, Copenhagen, Denmark
 Engineer: Johnny Stage

Charts

Weekly charts

Year-end charts

Decade-end charts

Certifications

See also
 List of number-one club tracks of 2001 (Australia)

References

External links
 "Played-A-Live (The Bongo Song)" at Discogs

2000 debut singles
2000 songs
Number-one singles in Denmark
Number-one singles in Switzerland
Safri Duo songs
Song recordings produced by Michael Parsberg
Universal Music Group singles